Stark is a city in Neosho County, Kansas, United States.  As of the 2020 census, the population of the city was 69.

History 
The first post office at Stark was established in January 1886.

Stark was laid out and platted in 1888. It was named after Stark County, Illinois. The Kansas City Pacific Railroad built through Stark and maintained passenger and freight depots in the town. The rail line soon became the Kansas City Division of the Missouri-Kansas-Texas Railroad and is still active today as part of the Union Pacific Railroad.

Geography
Stark is located at  (37.689592, -95.143573), at an elevation of 1,063 feet (324 m).

Stark is located east of U.S. Route 59 on K-201.

Demographics

2010 census
As of the census of 2010, there were 72 people, 39 households, and 25 families residing in the city. The racial makeup of the city was 100.0% White.

There were 39 households, of which 10.3% had children under the age of 18 living with them, 48.7% were married couples living together, 7.7% had a female householder with no husband present, 7.7% had a male householder with no wife present, and 35.9% were non-families. 30.8% of all households were made up of individuals, and 7.7% had someone living alone who was 65 years of age or older. The average household size was 1.85 and the average family size was 2.20.

The median age in the city was 54.3 years. 8.3% of residents were under the age of 18; 8.5% were between the ages of 18 and 24; 25% were from 25 to 44; 31.9% were from 45 to 64; and 26.4% were 65 years of age or older. The gender makeup of the city was 54.2% male and 45.8% female.

2000 census
As of the census of 2000, there were 106 people, 42 households, and 27 families residing in the city. The racial makeup of the city was 99.06% White and 0.94% Native American.

There were 42 households, out of which 28.6% had children under the age of 18 living with them, 45.2% were married couples living together, 11.9% had a female householder with no husband present, and 35.7% were non-families. 33.3% of all households were made up of individuals, and 16.7% had someone living alone who was 65 years of age or older. The average household size was 2.52 and the average family size was 3.30.

In the city, the population was spread out, with 33.0% under the age of 18, 7.5% from 18 to 24, 28.3% from 25 to 44, 19.8% from 45 to 64, and 11.3% who were 65 years of age or older. The median age was 34 years. For every 100 females, there were 112.0 males. For every 100 females age 18 and over, there were 97.2 males.

The median income for a household in the city was $27,500, and the median income for a family was $27,083. Males had a median income of $15,833 versus $15,625 for females. The per capita income for the city was $11,728. There were 16.1% of families and 17.2% of the population living below the poverty line, including 25.9% of under eighteens and none of those over 64.

References

External links
 Stark - Directory of Public Officials
 USD 101, local school district
 Stark city map, KDOT

Cities in Neosho County, Kansas
Cities in Kansas